Krogius is a surname. Notable people with the surname include:

Ernst Krogius (1865–1955), Finnish sailor
Nikolai Krogius (1930–2022), Russian chess player and referee
Ragnar Krogius (1903–1980), Finnish chess player